MacDougal Blues is the debut solo album from Drivin N Cryin vocalist Kevn Kinney, released on Island Records in 1990. The album received positive reviews.

Release and reception
After the album's January 1990 release, Kinney toured with producer Peter Buck the following month. The musical output of that tour encouraged Kinney and the other members of Drivin N Cryin to move from a hard rock/Southern rock sound to a more folk rock style. Buck found the experience to be enjoyable and one of his favorite production jobs.

Denise Sullivan of AllMusic Guide gave the album a positive review for Kinney's songwriting, and the editorial staff awarded the album 4.5 out of five stars. Spins Karen Schoemer compared the album favorably to Bob Dylan and included it in the magazine's "Heavy Rotation" column.

Track listing
All songs written by Kevn Kinney, except where noted
"MacDougal Blues" – 3:54
"Not Afraid to Die" – 4:48
"Lost and Found" (Kinney and Tim Nielsen) – 4:22
"Heard the Laughter Ending" – 4:09
"Last Song of Maddie Hope" – 3:47
"Gotta Get Out of Here" – 4:56
"The House Above Tina's Grocery" – 2:13
"Iron Mountain" (Buren Fowler, Kinney, Neilsen, and Jeff Sullivan) – 4:20
"Chico and Maria" – 3:00
"Hey Landlord (Meatloaf and Fishsticks)" (Randy Blazak, Danado Giordano, and Kevn Kinney) – 3:06
"Goodnight Rhyme" – 1:16

Personnel
Kevn Kinney – vocals, guitar, harmonica
Audrey Bernstein – photography
David Blackmon – fiddle
Peter Buck – dulcimer, guitar, mandolin, production, mixing
Buren Fowler – guitar, pedal steel guitar, banjo
Ted Jensen – mastering at Sterling Sound
Nita Karpf – cello
John Keane – engineering, mixing, guitar, electric slide guitar, bass guitar, banjo, percussion
Sue Kinney – backing vocals on "Lost and Found", "Chico & Maria", and "Goodnight Rhyme"
Ruth Leitman – photography
Mike Mills – walking whistle on "Chico & Maria"
Joel Morris – marimba
Moira Nelligan – accordion, fiddle, and backing vocals on "Iron Mountain"
Tim Nielsen – bass guitar, mandolin
George Norman – mandolin
Barbara Panter-Connah – fiddle
Kyle Pilgrim – double bass
Jennifer Sproul – hammer dulcimer
Jeff Sullivan – drums, percussion
Judy Troilo – art direction

References

External links

A live recording of several songs from MacDougal Blues on Internet Archive
Kinney discussing his songwriting, including on this album

1990 debut albums
Albums produced by Peter Buck
Island Records albums
Kevn Kinney albums
Folk rock albums by American artists